The 2009 Wilkes-Barre/Scranton Pioneers season was the team's eighth season of arena football. The Pioneers made another attempt to return to the ArenaCup after falling out of the playoff race for ArenaCup IX.  The team signed many key players from the 2008 campaign, including quarterback Ryan Vena and defensive lineman Alan Barnes.

The Pioneers returned to the ArenaCup, but lost to the Spokane Shock 74–27.

Rosters

Training camp

Week 1

Final roster

Team staff

Schedule

Regular season

Postseason

Final standings

Attendance

External links
ArenaFan Online 2009 Wilkes-Barre/Scranton Pioneers schedule
ArenaFan Online 2009 af2 standings
ArenaFan Online 2009 af2 attendance

Wilkes-Barre/Scranton Pioneers seasons
Wilkes-Barre Scranton Pioneers
Wilkes-Barre Scranton Pioneers